The US National Academies Press (NAP) was created to publish the reports issued by the National Academies of Sciences, Engineering, and Medicine, the National Academy of Engineering, the National Academy of Medicine, and the National Research Council. It publishes nearly 200 books a year on a wide range of topics in the sciences. The NAP's stated mission is seemingly self-contradictory: to disseminate as widely as possible the works of the National Academies of Sciences, Engineering, and Medicine, and to be financially self-sustaining through sales. This mission has led to great experimentation in openness regarding online publishing.

The National Academy Press (as it was known in 1993) was the first self-sustaining publisher to make its material available on the Web, for free, in an open access model. By 1997, 1000 reports were available as sequential page images (starting with i, then ii, then iii, then iv...), with a minimal navigational envelope. Their experience up to 1998 was already indicating that open access led to increased sales, at least with page images as the final viewable object.

From 1998 on, the NAP developed the "Openbook" online navigational envelope, producing stable page URLs, and enabling chapter-, page-, and in-book search navigation to images of the book pages (which were increasingly replaced by HTML chunks), to enable the user to browse the book. Notably, this page-by-page navigation was produced long before Amazon's Look Inside, or Google's Book Search.

1998 through the present, the NAP gradually evolved the Openbook to first enable better external findability (making the HTML page for the first page image of every chapter include the first 10 and last 10 pages of OCRed ASCII text of the chapter, to produce a robustly indexable first chapter page), as well as exploring the boundaries of knowledge discovery and exploration, implementing "Related Titles" in 2001, the "Find More Like This Chapter" in 2002, "Chapter Skim" in 2003, "Search Builder" and "Reference Finder" in 2004, and "Active Skim" and enhanced "Search Builder" in 2005.

Online pricing experiment
In 2003, the NAP published the results of an online experiment to determine the "cannibalization effect" that might obtain, if the NAP gave all reports away online, in PDF format.

Developed as a Mellon-funded grant, and working with the University of Maryland Business School, the experiment interrupted buyers just before finalizing an online order, with an opportunity to acquire the work in PDF for a randomly generated discount: 50%, 10%, 100%, 70% off the list price, and if the answer was "no", the NAP would offer one more step off the price.

The conclusion was that 42% of the customers, when interrupted when buying a print book online, would take the free PDF of the book, meaning that 58% of the potential purchasers were willing to pay to have a printed book. Significant implications to publishing strategies are produced by these numbers, especially in the context of NAP's "long tail" experience when it gave away free access to PDFs (about 50% of the list) to low-sales content, which resulted in only 33% loss of sales, over 18 months (while enabling 100 times the dissemination).

Through mid-2006, as reported at the AAUP annual meeting, the NAP remained financially self-sustaining as a publisher, even while progressively expanding the utility of the online experience, and increasing its online traffic and dissemination.

Multiple articles and presentations by Barbara Kline Pope, Executive Director of the NAP, and by Michael Jon Jensen, Director of Publishing Technologies for the NAP from 1998 through 2008, provide background on the evolving business strategies for "free in an environment of content abundance" that the National Academies Press continues to pursue.

Free PDFs
On June 2, 2011, the NAP announced that it would provide the full text of all of the reports of the National Academies of Sciences, Engineering, and Medicine as free PDF downloads.

March 28th, 2018 - 10,000 books now freely available online and for download.

At the end of 2022 there were 19 million PDFs download since all reports were made available for free.

See also

 List of English-language book publishing companies
 List of university presses

References

External links
 National Academies Press (official website)
 National Academies (parent institution)
 Barbara Kline Pope (executive director, Sep 1983 - Sep 2017)
 Alphonse MacDonald (publisher, June 2020 - present)
Book publishing companies of the United States
United States National Academies
Commercial digital libraries
American digital libraries